James Anthony Roberts (born 21 June 1996) is an English professional footballer who plays as a forward for Havant & Waterlooville.

Career
Roberts made his first team debut for Oxford United as a substitute in a 5–1 away defeat on 11 October 2014 against Cambridge United at Abbey Stadium. He made his first senior start, and scored his first two goals, in a first-round FA Cup win over Grimsby Town on 8 November 2014. He was rewarded with his first league start the following week at York City, where his debut league goal won the game for Oxford. He scored 5 goals in total in his inaugural season but, after not featuring in the opening 10 games of the following season, he was loaned to Chester for a month on 29 September 2015. Roberts joined Oxford City on loan in January 2016, and then Barnet the following month. Roberts joined Oxford City on loan for a second time in September 2016. In February 2017 he joined Stalybridge Celtic on loan for the rest of the season. Roberts joined Guiseley on a month's loan on 15 December 2017, later extended until the end of the 2017–18 season. At the end of the season, he was released by Oxford.

After a short spell with Halesowen Town, Roberts joined Hereford on 24 October 2018. On 28 March 2019, he was loaned out to Alvechurch until the end of the season.

Having been released by Hereford, on 17 June 2019 Roberts joined Spennymoor Town. The following season, he joined Oxford City. After a prolific season, he joined divisional rivals Havant & Waterlooville for an undisclosed fee.

Career statistics

References

External links

1996 births
Living people
Sportspeople from Aylesbury
English footballers
Association football forwards
Oxford United F.C. players
Chester F.C. players
Oxford City F.C. players
Barnet F.C. players
Stalybridge Celtic F.C. players
Guiseley A.F.C. players
Halesowen Town F.C. players
Hereford F.C. players
Alvechurch F.C. players
Spennymoor Town F.C. players
Havant & Waterlooville F.C. players
English Football League players
National League (English football) players
Southern Football League players
Footballers from Buckinghamshire